= Steele Indian School Park Pond =

Lake of the United States of America

- Location within Arizona
- Location: Phoenix, Arizona
- Coordinates: 33°29′58.23″N 112°4′13.41″W
- Basin countries: United States
- Surface area: 3 acres (1.2 ha)
- Average depth: 6 ft (1.8 m)
- Surface elevation: 1,100 ft (340 m)
- Settlements: Phoenix

Steele Indian School Park Pond is a lake located in Steele Indian School Park in Phoenix, east of Central Avenue and north of Indian School Road.

== Fish species ==
- Rainbow Trout
- Largemouth Bass
- Sunfish
- Catfish (Channel)
- Tilapia
- Carp
